Wu Assassins is an American supernatural action streaming television series, created by John Wirth and Tony Krantz that premiered on Netflix on August 8, 2019. The series stars Iko Uwais, Byron Mann, Lewis Tan, Lawrence Kao, Celia Au, Li Jun Li, Tommy Flanagan, and Katheryn Winnick. The first season received positive reviews, with critics praising the fight choreography, although there was criticism of the plot.

In February 2021, a standalone film titled Fistful of Vengeance was announced. The film continues the story from the ending of the first season. It was released on February 17, 2022.

Premise
Kai Jin, a young Chinatown chef in present-day San Francisco, becomes entangled with the Chinese Triad's pursuit of deadly ancient powers known as the "Wu Xing". After an encounter with a mystical spirit, Kai reluctantly becomes the Wu Assassin, imbued with the skill and power of 1,000 monks who chose to die together to place their collective essence into an amulet. Having absorbed the amulet, Kai uses his enhanced martial arts skills to recover supernatural powers from five modern day criminals threatening to destroy the world. He is the 1,000th, and last, in the line of Wu Assassins.

Cast and characters

Main

 Iko Uwais as Kai Jin, the main protagonist and a Chinese-Indonesian chef in San Francisco's Chinatown, who learns that he is the last of the Wu Assassins, whose duty it is to kill the five Wu Warlords, who possess supernatural powers based around fire, wood, earth, metal and water. As the Wu Assassin, he has increased physical strength and agility, is able to change his appearance to hide his identity, and can withstand the Wu Lords' supernatural attacks.
 Byron Mann as Uncle Six, a leader of the Triad who runs the criminal world in San Francisco's Chinatown and is Kai Jin's adoptive stepfather. As the Fire Wu he can create tendrils and projectiles made of fire, and can heat up and set objects alight.
 Li Jun Li as Jenny Wah, a young restaurateur who runs her family's Chinese-American restaurant, Master Wah's, and is Kai Jin's friend.
 Celia Au as Ying Ying, a woman who teaches Kai the ways of a Wu Assassin. She was the first Wu Assassin to hunt and fight the Wu Warlords, and only one of the first 999 Wu Assassins to successfully kill all 5 Warlords and imprison their collective Wu Xing powers, only to be stymied moments later when attacked, and killed, by a random soldier.
 Lewis Tan as Lu Xin Lee, Kai's friend who owns Lee's Wheels, a custom garage, which is also a front for two auto theft rings run by the Triad and McCullough respectively.
 Lawrence Kao as Tommy Wah, Jenny's older brother, who is a heroin addict and a member of the Triad.
 Tommy Flanagan as Alec McCullough, a Scottish crime boss operating mostly in Europe, who relocates to America to try to take over the Triad's territory in San Francisco's Chinatown. He is a former Wu Assassin who became the Wood Wu Lord, and as such is able to manipulate plants and trees, and has healing powers that result in him having an extended lifespan.
 Katheryn Winnick as Christine "CG" Gavin, an undercover inspector of the San Francisco Police Department, recently hired to work at Lee's Wheels.

Recurring

 Tzi Ma as Mr. Young, Kai's neighbor and a Chinese grocery owner
 JuJu Chan as Zan, the triad's lieutenant and Uncle Six's right-hand woman, though she is determined to become the triad's leader
 Mark Dacascos as an unnamed monk, whose body and face disguises Kai's identity when he fights as the Wu Assassin 
 Cranston Johnson as Frank Fletcher, the police captain of San Francisco Police Department and CG's boss

Guest
 Jeff Fahey as Jack, a retired cop whom CG visits for information on Uncle Six (in "Fire Chicken")
 Robin McLeavy as Maggie McCullough, Alec McCullough's late wife (in "Codladh Sámh", "Gu Assassins", and "Paths: Part 2")
 Kevin Durand as James Baxter, the Earth Wu, who can control the earth, telekinetically move rocks, and turn flesh to stone (in "Legacy")
 Summer Glau as Miss Jones, the Water Wu, who can turn into and manipulate water (in "Paths: Parts 1 & 2")
 Travis Caldwell as Gideon, the Metal Wu, who can manipulate metal, electronics, electricity and possess people's bodies through their hemoglobin (in "Paths: Parts 1 & 2")
 Davin Tong as young Tommy.

Episodes

Production

Development
On June 29, 2018, it was announced that Netflix had given the production a series order for a ten-episode first season. The series is co-created, executive produced and co-written by John Wirth. Other executive producers include co-creator Tony Krantz and Nomadic Pictures' Chad Oakes and Mike Frislev. Stephen Fung will direct the first two episodes, with Krantz expected to helm another. In addition to playing the lead, Uwais also will serve as producer, lead martial arts and fight choreographer and stunt coordinator.

Casting
In June 2018, Uwais was cast in the lead role of Kai Jin. In the same month, it was announced that Byron Mann was cast in the series regular role as Uncle Six. In July 2018, it was announced that Tzi Ma, Tommy Flanagan, Lewis Tan and Katheryn Winnick were cast in their respective main roles of Mr. Young, Alec McCullough, Lu Xin Lee and Christine Gavin. In August 2018, it was reported that JuJu Chan and Mark Dacascos were cast in recurring roles. In October 2018, Lawrence Kao and Celia Au joined the main cast. In November 2018, it was revealed that Summer Glau was cast in the minor role of Miss Jones. In January 2019, Li Jun Li joined the main cast in the role of Jenny Wah.

Filming 
Principal photography for the first season took place on location in Vancouver, Canada from August 8, 2018, to November 20, 2018.

Follow-up film 

On February 26, 2021, Netflix ordered a 90-minute film project titled Wu Assassins: Fistful of Vengeance. It serves as a follow-up to the first season. Living Films was involved in the production of the film. Roel Reiné directed the film, with Cameron Litvack, Jessica Chou and Yalun Tu credited for the screenplay. After the film announcement, it was confirmed that Iko Uwais, Lewis Tan, Lawrence Kao and Juju Chan would reprise their respective roles (Kai, Lu Xin, Tommy and Zan) in Wu Assassins: Fistful of Vengeance. Additionally, it was confirmed that Pearl Thusi, Francesca Corney, Jason Tobin, Rhatha Phongam and Simon Kuke were cast in the film. Filming for Wu Assassins: Fistful of Vengeance took place in Thailand in early 2021. The film was released on February 17, 2022.

Release 
On July 23, 2019, the official trailer for the series was released.

Critical reception 
The review aggregator Rotten Tomatoes reported the first season had 83% approval rating based on 23 reviews, with an average rating of 6.79/10. The critical consensus reads "Though its story at times leaves something to be desired, Wu Assassins exceptional choreography and bold aesthetic makes it an action packed delight."

Nick Allen for RogerEbert.com previewed the first three episodes and gave a positive review. Allen wrote: "[Wu Assassins] harnesses Uwais' energy as both a fighter and an actor in an exciting fashion, and creates a giddy opportunity for martial arts awesomeness to flourish."
Stephen Harber from Den of Geek wrote: "I think this show has potential. I like the cast. I like the premise. I like the Shaw Brothers vibes and that faint odor of tokusatsu I'm picking up on, too." He suggests the show is a "guilty pleasure" but is concerned about the B-stories and side characters, which he says feels padded out.
Isaac Feldberg of The Boston Globe says the show "isn't reinventing the wheel. But it does effectively showcase lead Iko Uwais" and praises the fight sequences, "brawls so carefully choreographed they play like bone-crunching ballets — "Wu" coasts on the same, all-important rule of cool every Hollywood action franchise [...] seems to have forgotten."

References

External links 
 
 

2010s American crime drama television series
2019 American television series debuts
American action television series
Martial arts television series
English-language Netflix original programming
Serial drama television series
Television shows filmed in Vancouver
Television shows set in San Francisco
Triad (organized crime)
Chinatown, San Francisco in fiction
2010s American supernatural television series
Chinese mythology in popular culture
Fictional portrayals of the San Francisco Police Department
Asian-American television